Urbane may refer to:
 Urbanity
 LG Watch Urbane, a 2015 smartwatch

People with the given name
 Urbane F. Bass (1880–1918), African-American doctor and first lieutenant in the United States Army
 Urbane Pickering (1899–1970), American baseball player

See also
 Urban (disambiguation)
 Urbane Jazz, a 1955 album by Roy Eldridge and Benny Carter